Zherekhovo is a rural locality (a selo) in Tolpukhovskoye Rural Settlement, Sobinsky District, Vladimir Oblast, Russia. The population was 357 as of 2010. There are 6 streets.

Geography 
Zherekhovo is located 23 km north of Sobinka (the district's administrative centre) by road. Dobrynino is the nearest rural locality.

History
Zherekhovo was granted the Vsevolozhsky family by Tsar Michael in 1622.

References 

Rural localities in Sobinsky District
Vladimirsky Uyezd